The Hospitaller commandery of Saint-Jean-d'Acre is a monumental complex founded by the Order of St. John of Jerusalem, also known as the Knights Hospitallers. It is located in the city of Saint-Jean-d'Acre (now Acre in Israel). In the 13th century, the commandery became the headquarters of the Order until the fall of the city in 1291.

History

The first years 
From the first years of the establishment of the Crusaders in the city, the Hospitallers received donated properties. In 1110, King Baldwin granted the Knights Hospitaller permission to keep the constructions located north of the Sainte-Croix church. In the years 1130, the buildings were damaged during works near the church and the Hospitallers decided to move near the 12th century north wall of the city. This is the actual place of the commandery.

In 1149, the first testimony of the commandery is in a document concerning the construction of the Saint-Jean church. In 1169, a pilgrim described the commandery of the Hospitallers of Acre as a very impressive fortified building.

Relocation of headquarters 
After the defeat of Hattin in 1187, Saladin took the city. In 1191, during the third Crusade, the Frankish reconquered Acre after its siege. The Hospitallers moved back in their buildings. Jerusalem is no longer in the hands of the crusaders. And so the commandery becomes the new headquarters of the order. A new construction campaign took place between the end of 12th century and 13th century with new wings and additional floors.

Architecture

The inner courtyard 
The courtyard has an area of 1200 m2 and is surrounded by a series of arcades. On the east side, a staircase leads to the upper parts. A well with a depth of 4.5 m is located near the north side and two shallow pools are next to this well. On the south side a pool with a depth of 1.5 m and another well were built.

The north wing 
This wing was built along the north wall. There are ten vaulted rooms ten meters high built during the Frankish era. The exterior wall is massive with a thickness of 3.5 m. Later to the west, two new rooms will complete this building. In the south wall, there are windows that overlook a narrow passage and the wall of the pillar room. The entrance of the building is in the south side wall.

The west wing

The east wing

The south wing

The Saint-Jean church

See also 

 Pierre de Vieille-Brioude

Gallery

References 

Knights Hospitaller
Sieges of the Crusades
Medieval sites in Israel
Acre, Israel